Altbronn Abbey or Our Lady of Mercy Abbey is a former Trappistine nunnery in Ergersheim, Bas-Rhin, northeastern France.

History
Throughout the 19th century, Oelenberg Abbey in Haut-Rhin was a double monastery with masculine and feminine communities. These two communities were founded in 1815 and 1825 by monks and nuns who fled from France to Kleinburlo and Rosenthal, Westphalia during the Revolutionary and Imperial periods. In 1825, the 34 nuns settled in the monastery that the monks built when they came back from exile.

However, both monasteries prospered and founded several daughter houses, especially in Germany and Benelux. The commnuties grew (84 nuns in 1893), so Oelenberg became too small. 80 nuns settled near Ergersheim, Bas-Rhin in the Abbey of Our Lady of Altbronn, named after a local pilgrimage that has existed since 1397. The abbey was canonically approved on July 8, 1927.

Houses
The house of Ergersheim is a former noble property built by the Simonis family in 1826. It is located on a 4-hectare land. The building was transformed into a monastery by architect Dacheux. The foundation stone was laid on September 9, 1894.

On December 3, 2009, the community which had become too small for the Altbronn site (20 nuns in 2000, 17 in 2009) and which was disturbed by the demographic growth of the village and the growing noise, decided to sell the abbey and to move to Baumgarten Abbey in the nearby village of Bernardvillé.

List of abbesses 
 During the exile
 Mother Augustin de Chabannes (from 1796 to 1801)
 Mother Edmond Paul de Barth (from 1801 to 1808)
 Mother Helena Van de Broech (from 1808 to 1825).

 At Oelenberg

 At Ergersheim

 At Baumgarten
Marie-Odile Faller (since 3 December 2009).

See also
List of Cistercian monasteries in France

References

Bibliography

 
 

Former Christian monasteries in France
Trappistine monasteries in France
1895 establishments in France
Buildings and structures completed in 1895
Christian monasteries in Bas-Rhin
2009 disestablishments in France